Hitler – Dead or Alive is a 1942 American propaganda war film directed by Nick Grinde. The plot of Hitler – Dead or Alive was inspired by true events but takes a quasi-comic tone.

Plot
In 1939, during the early days of World War II, Samuel Thornton (Russell Hicks), a prominent American businessman, offers a reward of one million dollars to bring Adolf Hitler to justice, dead or alive.  He hires three gangster ex-convicts released from Alcatraz prison, Steve Maschick (Ward Bond), Hans "Dutch" Havermann (Warren Hymer) and Joe "The Book" Conway (Paul Fix).

The three join the Royal Canadian Air Force and hijack an aircraft flown by Johnny Stevens (Bruce Edwards) to enter German airspace. With Johnny joining them, the group pose as musicians to gain access to Hitler (Bobby Watson). With the help of Else von Brandt (Dorothy Tree), the gangsters capture Hitler and quickly cut his hair and shave off his moustache as SS soldiers try to break the door in.  When the SS manage to enter the room, they fail to recognize their leader and drag all the men, including Hitler, outside to be shot.

A desperate Hitler makes a break for it and is shot by the SS officer in charge, who states disdainfully and ironically: "To think that Germany could produce a piece of filth like you." Steve makes a long patriotic speech while facing a firing squad.

Cast

 Ward Bond as Steve Maschick
 Dorothy Tree as Else von Brandt
 Warren Hymer as Hans "Dutch" Havermann
 Paul Fix as Joe "The Book" Conway
 Russell Hicks as Samuel Thornton
 Bruce Edwards as Johnny Stevens
 Felix Basch as Col. Hecht
 Bobby Watson as Adolf Hitler (credited as Bob Watson)
 Frederick Giermann as Meyer
 Kenneth Harlan as Cutler
 Fee Malten as Greta

Production
Principal photography on Hitler – Dead or Alive began on August 6, 1942 at Fine Arts Studios.

Reception
Film historian Alun Evans in Brassey's Guide to War Films, reviewed Hitler – Dead or Alive, comparing and contrasting it to other contemporary features, The Devil with Hitler, (1942), That Nazi Nuisance (1943) and The Hitler Gang (1944). He noted the earlier film was "... (a) Satirical farce about three ex-Alcatraz cons plotting to kill Hitler ..."

Historian M.B.B. Biskupski, in his overview of the treatment of Poles in American war-time cinema, reviewed the film as possibly containing a rare war-time reference to a Polish-American character (Steve Maschik).  He noted that the film "may be the worst film made in the World War II era."

In other media
In November 2012, while being interviewed by Playboy magazine, filmmaker Quentin Tarantino admitted the inspiration for his film Inglourious Basterds came from Hitler - Dead or Alive.

See also
Hitler's Children
The Hitler Gang
One Hundred Years of Evil
The Strange Death of Adolf Hitler (film)

References

Notes

Citations

Bibliography

 Evans, Alun. Brassey's Guide to War Films. Dulles, Virginia: Potomac Books, 2000. .

External links

 
 
 
 

1942 films
American aviation films
American World War II propaganda films
American satirical films
1940s English-language films
American black-and-white films
Cultural depictions of Adolf Hitler
War adventure films
Alternate Nazi Germany films
American alternate history films
Films set in the 1940s
1942 comedy-drama films
Films directed by Nick Grinde
American comedy-drama films
1940s war films
American vigilante films
American exploitation films